This is a chronological listing of Fred Astaire stage, motion picture, radio, and television performances.

The following color-coding is used for these different mediums:

1905—1920

1921—1930 

1931—1940 

1941—1950

1951—1960

1961—1970

1971—1980

1981—1987

Sources 
 
 
 
 Green, Stanley, & Burt Goldblatt. Starring Fred Astaire, Dodd 1973, 
 Mueller, John. Astaire Dancing — The Musical Films of Fred Astaire, Knopf 1985, 

Chronology